Krásnohorská Cave is a karst cave situated at the northern foot of the Silická planina Plain, in the Slovak Karst, 6.5 km southeast of Rožňava, in Slovakia. It grows significantly in volume every year as the incessant drips solidify. 

Description
Part of the cave from the entrance to the Hall of Giants (Sieň obrov) is formed in dolomite and dolomitic limestones with impressive limestone layers. The back parts of the cave, like the Pearl Passage (Chodba perál), the Great Hall (Veľká sieň), and the Mirror Hall (Zrkadlová sieň), are located in pure limestone areas. The Great Canyon (Veľký kaňon) passageway was formed as a result of tectonic faults which also helped shape large chambers in the back part of the cave, discovered by Rožnava cavers in 1964. Like the other caves in the Slovak Karst zone, it is on the UNESCO List of the World Natural Heritage.

See also
List of caves in Slovakia

References

External links

Krásnohorská cave at krasnohorskajaskyna.sk

Show caves in Slovakia
World Heritage Sites in Slovakia
Limestone caves
Geography of Košice Region
Tourist attractions in Košice Region